During the early evening of 23 February 2021, Boko Haram militants fired a series of rocket-propelled grenades in Maiduguri, Borno State, Nigeria. The attacks killed at least 10 people; many others were injured.

The terrorist attack 
The terrorists started from Boboshe, a well-known Boko Haram base, and crossed the defensive barrier around Maiduguri. They then started shooting in the north-eastern Nigerian city. One of the rockets hit a playground. The shots were heard as people ran for safety. The initial, seemingly aimless shooting was followed by an attack on the University of Maiduguri, where the terrorists' gunfire had already been targeted. 

During the incident, several high-profile structures in the city were damaged, including a mosque as well as Maiduguri International airport.

The airport attack in particular gathered concern, given that it could begin a new trend for Boko Haram to target commercial airplanes.

Aftermath 
In the aftermath of the rocket strikes, Nigerian president Muhammadu Buhari took a visit to the city, including the airport.

See also
List of terrorist incidents in 2021
Timeline of the Boko Haram insurgency

References

2021 murders in Nigeria
2020s in Borno State
2020s massacres in Nigeria
2021 rocket attacks
21st-century mass murder in Nigeria
2021 rocket
Boko Haram bombings
Explosions in 2021
2021 rocket attacks
Grenade attacks
Islamic terrorist incidents in 2021
March 2021 crimes in Africa
Mass murder in 2021
2021 rocket attacks
Terrorist incidents in Nigeria in 2021